BTB/POZ domain-containing protein 2 is a protein that in humans is encoded by the BTBD2 gene.

Function 

The C-terminus of the protein encoded by this gene binds topoisomerase I. The N-terminus contains a proline-rich region and a BTB/POZ domain (broad-complex, Tramtrack and bric a brac/Pox virus and Zinc finger), both of which are typically involved in protein-protein interactions. Subcellularly, the protein localizes to cytoplasmic bodies.

Interactions 

BTBD2 has been shown to interact with TOP1.

References

External links

Further reading